Urosalpinx baudoni is an extinct species of sea snail, a marine gastropod mollusk in the family Muricidae, the murex snails or rock snails.

Description

Distribution
Fossils were found in Eocene strata of Paris Basin, France.

References

 Morlet, L. 1888. Catalogue des coquilles fossiles recueillies dans quelques localités récemment exploitées du Bassin de Paris et descripition des espèces nouvelles. Journal de Conchyliologie 36(2):136-220, pls. 8-10
 Cossmann (M.), 1913 - Catalogue illustré des coquilles fossiles de l'Éocène des environs de Paris (5ème appendice). Annales de la Société royale Zoologique et Malacologique de Belgique, t. 49, p. 19-238 
 Le Renard, J. & Pacaud, J. (1995). Révision des mollusques Paléogènes du Bassin de Paris. II. Liste des références primaires des espèces. Cossmanniana. 3: 65-132.

External links
 

baudoni
Gastropods described in 1888
Eocene gastropods